Meriyanda Chengappa Nanaiah (M.C. Nanaiah) is a Karnataka, India politician who has been politically active for over 30 years. After being in Janta Dal (Secular), he joined Congress again in 2018. He is five-time Legislative Council member and former Law Minister. A book called ‘Nenapugalu Maasuva Munna’ (Before memories fade) (2005) has also been published by a journalist on Nanaiah's life.

Awards and recognition 

 Ramakrishna Hegde award

References 

Year of birth missing (living people)
Living people
Janata Dal (Secular) politicians
Karnataka politicians
Indian National Congress politicians from Karnataka